Roger Gervolino (Nouméa, 17 December 1909 – Nouméa, 24 April 1991) was a New Caledonian politician.  He served as a member of the National Assembly of France for three terms, from 21 October 1945 to 10 June 1946, 2 June 1946 to 27 November 1946, and 10 November 1946 to 4 July 1951, sitting as a member of the Democratic and Socialist Union of the Resistance.

In August 1946, he urged the French government to allow New Caledonia to access foreign markets.

References

Bibliography

1909 births
1991 deaths
People from Nouméa
New Caledonia politicians
Democratic and Socialist Union of the Resistance politicians